Einar Páll Tómasson (born 18 October 1968) is a retired Icelandic football defender.

References

1968 births
Living people
Einar Pall Tomasson
Einar Pall Tomasson
SC Paderborn 07 players
Degerfors IF players
Raufoss IL players
Einar Pall Tomasson
Association football defenders
Einar Pall Tomasson
Expatriate footballers in Germany
Einar Pall Tomasson
Expatriate footballers in Sweden
Einar Pall Tomasson
Expatriate footballers in Norway
Einar Pall Tomasson
Einar Pall Tomasson
Einar Pall Tomasson
Allsvenskan players